Saan Ka Man Naroroon (International title: Wherever You Are) is a Philippine television series on ABS-CBN that ran from April 12, 1999 to March 23, 2001 replacing the 2-year run Mula sa Puso and was replaced by  Sa Dulo ng Walang Hanggan . It stars Claudine Barretto in the three contrasting roles of Rosario, Rosenda and Rosemarie or Rosita, triplets who were separated at birth.  The series was popular throughout its run and also led to the rise of Barretto's acting career.

This was Rico Yan's last soap opera before his death on March 29, 2002 during his Holy Week vacation at Dos Palmas Resort in Palawan.

The 2018 series The Blood Sisters rehashes the idea of this soap with head of Dreamscape Television Head Roldeo T. Endrinal using the same idea of “Saan Ka Man Naroroon” based on three different triplets who have different characteristics.

As of June 2021, the series re-airs globally on The Filipino Channel.

Plot
A storm occurs on the night when Dolores is about to give birth, threatening to completely ruin their livelihood.  Her husband Juancho is forced to leave her in the incapable hands of her sister, Violeta.  Dolores gives birth to the triplets Rosario, Rosenda, Rosemarie.  However, Arsenio, Dolores' former lover, is the attending physician, and he takes the youngest triplet, Rosita due to his bitterness and resentment.  He convinces Dolores and Juancho that Rosita died at birth, and then raises Rose Marie abroad where she remains ignorant of her true origins and becomes very sophisticated.

As the years pass, rivalry arises between the remaining twins.  Rosario grows up to be charming and sweet but unhealthy, and her parents give her a lot of attention.  Rosenda therefore grows very jealous of Rosario, as well as self-centered and scheming.  Following a confrontation between the twins, Rosario drowns, convincing her parents that they have already lost her.  Unbeknownst to them, however, she has been found at the bay shore by a kind-hearted couple who raise her as their own.

From then on the three sisters live separately, unaware of each other's existence until they rediscover each other at the expense of their family's well-kept secret and long-forgotten sins.

Cast and characters 

Protagonist
 Claudine Barreto portrays three roles:
 Rosario B. Ocampo / Rosario de Villa (main protagonist)
 Rosenda B. Ocampo (main antagonist)
 Rosita B. Ocampo / Rosemarie Madrigal (main protagonist)

Main cast
 Rico Yan as Daniel Pineda 
 Gladys Reyes as Melissa Baldamesa-Ocampo
 Mylene Dizon as Karen De Villa
 Carlos Agassi as Richard Luciano
 Leandro Muñoz as Joshua
 Diether Ocampo as Bart 
 Spencer Reyes as Itoy

Supporting cast
 Eric Quizon as Juancho Ocampo
 Cherry Pie Picache as Dolores Bermudez-Ocampo 
 Jackie Lou Blanco as Violeta Bermudez-Antonino
 Joel Torre as Juanito Ocampo
 Isabel Rivas as Marilou
 Rustom Padilla as Alex
 Juan Rodrigo as Dominador "Domeng" Javier
 Vivian Foz as Lilia Madrigal
 Augusto Victa as Ben De Villa
 Fanny Serrano as Marlo
 Debra Liz as Zeny
 Nonie Buencamino as Arsenio Madrigal
 Gina Pareño as Maria Jovita "Marita" Bermudez
 Shamaine Centenera-Buencamino as Aurora Madrigal
 Janice de Belen as Margarita Javier-Pineda
 Mark Gil as Edward Luciano
 Dennis Roldan as Greg
 Kier Legaspi as Deryo
 Ariel Rivera as Angelo
 Allen Dizon as Rollie
 Karla Estrada as Lilay
 Jet Alcantara as Carl
 Candy Pangilinan  as Jengky

Special participation 
 Caridad Sanchez as Cleotilde De Villa
 Boots Anson-Roa as Amparo Luciano

Production
Piolo Pascual was first tapped to play one of the three leading men characters but he was chosen to portray the role of Brian in the soap opera Esperanza.

See also
List of shows previously aired by ABS-CBN
List of telenovelas of ABS-CBN

References

External links 
 

ABS-CBN drama series
1999 Philippine television series debuts
2001 Philippine television series endings
Filipino-language television shows
Television shows set in the Philippines